Xin Ying is the Executive Director of the Beijing LGBT Center. Ying started China's first transgender hotline and played a vital role in arranging mental health services for the LGBTQ community in China.

References

Living people
Chinese human rights activists
Chinese LGBT rights activists
Chinese women activists
Mental health activists
Year of birth missing (living people)
Women civil rights activists